Nora Brambilla (February 19, 1964) is an Italian and German theoretical particle physicist known for her research on quarkonium, particles composed of two quarks instead of the more usual three. She is a professor of theoretical particle and nuclear physics at the Technical University of Munich.

Education and career
Brambilla is originally from Milan, and holds both Italian and German citizenship. She studied particle physics at the University of Milan, completing her PhD there in 1993. In 1999, she earned a habilitation in theoretical physics at the University of Vienna.

After various research positions, she became a tenured faculty member at the University of Milan in 2002, before moving to Munich in 2008. She is currently the head of a research group at the Physik-Department of the Technical University of Munich.

Recognition
In 2012, Brambilla was named a Fellow of the American Physical Society "for her contributions to the theory of heavy-quark-antiquark-systems, including the development of new effective field theories, and for contributions to the field of heavy-quarkonium physics through the founding and leadership of the Quarkonium Working Group".

References

External links
Research group home page

20th-century births
Year of birth missing (living people)
20th-century Italian women scientists
20th-century German women scientists
20th-century German physicists
20th-century Italian physicists
21st-century Italian women scientists
21st-century German women scientists
21st-century German physicists
21st-century Italian physicists
Living people
German women physicists
Italian women physicists
University of Milan alumni
Academic staff of the University of Milan
Academic staff of the Technical University of Munich
Fellows of the American Physical Society
Particle physicists
Scientists from Milan